Lady Mongryangwon of the Pyeongsan Bak clan was the daughter of Bak Su-gyeong who became the 29th wife of Taejo of Goryeo. Her aunt became his 26th wife and her cousin became his  28th wife. Her father was excellent in physical appearance, won every time went to war and took part in the fight against Gyeon Hwon while rescued Wang Geon from crisis when he was surrounded by the Later Baekje armies. It was said that he was entrusted with noble title and when Wang Geon paid a tribute to consideration of his servants' merits, Su-gyeong specially trusted with a special gift of 200 yards (200결). Bak's families also maintained their power until the accession of Wang So.  However, Wang So soon reorganized the system to strengthen the royal authority and purged the nobles which led Bak to death.

References

External links
몽량원부인 on Encykorea .

Year of birth unknown
Year of death unknown
Consorts of Taejo of Goryeo
People from North Hwanghae